Ananias Eloi Castro Monteiro (20 January 1989 – 28 November 2016), known as Ananias, was a Brazilian footballer who last played as an attacking midfielder for Chapecoense.

Ananias was one of the victims when LaMia Airlines Flight 2933 crashed on 28 November 2016.

Career
Born in São Luís, Maranhão, Ananias graduated from Bahia's youth categories, and made his professional debut in 2008 Série B. In 2011, he was loaned to Portuguesa, in a two-year deal.

After good performances at the club, and with Lusa being compared to Barcelona, Ananias was called Ananiesta (compared to Andrés Iniesta) by the fans.
In April 2012, Portuguesa bought half of his rights from Bahia.

On 10 January 2013 Ananias moved to Cruzeiro, with Souza moving in the opposite direction. On 29 May, however, he was loaned to Palmeiras until the end of the year.

After achieving promotion with Verdão, Ananias was subsequently loaned to Sport Recife (also scoring the first official goal of Allianz Parque in a 2–0 away win against former club Palmeiras on 19 November 2014) and Chapecoense.

On 11 December 2015, Ananias signed a permanent contract with Chape. The following 2 November, he scored the equalizer in a 1–1 draw at San Lorenzo for the year's Copa Sudamericana, which would later ensure his team in the finals through the away goals rule.

Death
On 28 November 2016, whilst at the service of Chapecoense, Ananias was among the fatalities of the LaMia Airlines Flight 2933 accident in the Colombian village of Cerro Gordo, La Unión, Antioquia.

Career statistics

Honours
Portuguesa
Campeonato Brasileiro Série B: 2011

Palmeiras
Campeonato Brasileiro Série B: 2013

Sport Recife
Copa do Nordeste: 2014
Campeonato Pernambucano: 2014

Chapecoense
Campeonato Catarinense: 2016
 Copa Sudamericana: 2016 (posthumously)

References

External links

1989 births
2016 deaths
People from São Luís, Maranhão
Brazilian footballers
Association football midfielders
Campeonato Brasileiro Série A players
Campeonato Brasileiro Série B players
Esporte Clube Bahia players
Associação Portuguesa de Desportos players
Cruzeiro Esporte Clube players
Sociedade Esportiva Palmeiras players
Sport Club do Recife players
Associação Chapecoense de Futebol players
Footballers killed in the LaMia Flight 2933 crash
Sportspeople from Maranhão